Albion Correctional Facility is a medium security women's prison in Town of Albion, Orleans County, New York, United States, that is operated by the New York State Department of Correctional Services.  The site was founded in 1894 as the Western House of Refuge for Women, then later the Albion State Training School. The prison is just outside the village of Albion.

Albion is one of New York facilities exclusively for women, the others being  Bedford Hills Correctional Facility, Taconic Correctional Facility.  Most famously, Albion housed "Long Island Lolita" Amy Fisher for 3½ years; she was then transferred to the Bedford Hills Correctional Facility for Women, the only maximum security prison for women in New York State and located in Bedford Hills, New York.

As of 2010 Albion had a working capacity of 1247.

Notable inmates
Amy Fisher, transferred to the Bedford Hills Correctional Facility for Women
Anna Sorokin, fraudster

References

External links 
 Albion Correctional Facility

Women's prisons in New York (state)
Prisons in New York (state)
Albion, Orleans County, New York
Buildings and structures in Orleans County, New York
1894 establishments in New York (state)